Epiphyas is a genus of moths of the family Tortricidae in the tribe  Archipini.

Species

Epiphyas ammotypa (Turner, 1945)
Epiphyas ashworthana (Newman, 1856)
Epiphyas asthenopis (Lower, 1902)
Epiphyas aulacana (Meyrick, 1881)
Epiphyas balioptera (Turner, 1916)
Epiphyas caryotis (Meyrick, 1910)
Epiphyas cerussata (Meyrick, 1910)
Epiphyas cetrata (Meyrick, 1910)
Epiphyas dotatana (Walker, 1863)
Epiphyas epichorda (Meyrick, 1910)
Epiphyas erysibodes (Turner, 1916)
Epiphyas eucyrta Turner, 1926
Epiphyas eugramma (Lower, 1899)
Epiphyas euphara (Turner, 1945)
Epiphyas euraphodes (Turner, 1916)
Epiphyas eveleena (Lower, 1916)
Epiphyas fabricata (Meyrick, 1910)
Epiphyas flebilis (Turner, 1939)
Epiphyas haematephora (Turner, 1916)
Epiphyas haematodes (Turner, 1916)
Epiphyas hemiphoena (Turner, 1927)
Epiphyas hyperacria (Turner, 1916)
Epiphyas iodes (Meyrick, 1910)
Epiphyas lathraea (Meyrick, 1910)
Epiphyas liadelpha (Meyrick, 1910)
Epiphyas loxotoma (Turner, 1927)
Epiphyas lycodes (Meyrick, 1910)
Epiphyas lypra (Turner, 1945)
Epiphyas ocyptera (Meyrick, 1910)
Epiphyas oresigona (Turner, 1939)
Epiphyas oriotes (Turner, 1916)
Epiphyas peloxythana (Meyrick, 1881)
Epiphyas plastica (Meyrick, 1910)
Epiphyas postvittana (Walker, 1863)
Epiphyas pulla (Turner, 1945)
Epiphyas scleropa (Meyrick, 1910)
Epiphyas sobrina (Turner, 1945)
Epiphyas spodota (Meyrick, 1910)
Epiphyas xylodes (Meyrick, 1910)

Former species
Epiphyas chlidana Turner, 1926

See also
 List of Tortricidae genera

References

 , 1927, Pap. R. Soc. Tasmania 1926: 125. 
 , 2005, World Catalogue of Insects 5.

External links

 tortricidae.com

 
Archipini
Tortricidae genera
Taxa named by Alfred Jefferis Turner